Luca Giudici (born 10 March 1992) is an Italian professional footballer who plays as a left winger for  club Lecco.

Club career
On 31 January 2019, he joined Giana Erminio on loan from Monza. On 9 July 2019, he moved to Lecco on loan.

On 6 July 2020, he returned to Lecco on a permanent basis. On 1 February 2021, he joined Carrarese on loan.

References

External links
 

1992 births
Living people
People from Brianza
Sportspeople from the Province of Como
Footballers from Lombardy
Italian footballers
Association football forwards
Association football midfielders
Association football wingers
Serie C players
Serie D players
S.C. Caronnese S.S.D. players
A.C. Monza players
A.S. Giana Erminio players
Calcio Lecco 1912 players
Carrarese Calcio players